The Pleasance Theatre Trust (often simply called The Pleasance) is a venue operator and producer of live events, known internationally for being one of the major, so-called "Big Four", operators at the Edinburgh Festival Fringe, the world's largest arts festival. The trust is named after The Pleasance, the students' union venue complex which it runs in Edinburgh during the Fringe, although the organisation's operations have expanded from that original base to include another venue complex, the Potterrow Student Centre (branded as Pleasance Dome) during the Fringe, and a year-round base in London, Pleasance Islington. 

Fringe events were first held under "The Pleasance" banner in 1985, although the trust itself was only founded in 1994, before the Pleasance Islington was established in 1995.

Gallery

References

External links
Pleasance website

Edinburgh Festival Fringe
1985 establishments in Scotland